Stigmella generalis is a moth of the family Nepticulidae. It was described by Scoble in 1978. It is found in South Africa (it was described from the Cape Province).

The larvae feed on Rhus species. They probably mine the leaves of their host plant.

References

Endemic moths of South Africa
Nepticulidae
Moths of Africa
Moths described in 1978